Let Them Talk is a 2009 album by Gary U.S. Bonds.

Track listing
"Whine" (Laurie C. Anderson, Gary "U.S." Bonds, Mark Leimbach)
"Pour Me" (Anderson, Bonds, Leimbach)
"If I Live Through This" (Pam Reynolds) 
"Let Them Talk" (Sonny Thompson)
"Get It Together" (Danny Kean) 
"Have Mercy" (Leimbach)
"I'm Gone" (Kean)
"She's a Woman" (Anderson, Bonds)
"I Got Love" (Kean)
"I Forgot How Bad My Good Woman Could Be" (James Timothy Du Bois, Arnold Goldstein, Jim Hurt)
"Burden" (Anderson, Bonds)
"Shake a Hand" (Joe Morris)

References

2009 albums
Gary U.S. Bonds albums